Gelechia abjunctella is a moth of the family Gelechiidae. It is found in South Africa.

Adults are blackish cinereous, the forewings with a few black points and with some cinereous speckles, wholly cinereous along the exterior border. The exterior border is very oblique. The hindwings are pale cinereous, shining.

References

Endemic moths of South Africa
Moths described in 1864
Gelechia